Touffailles is a commune in the Tarn-et-Garonne department in the Occitanie region in southern France.

Geography
The Séoune forms parts of the commune's south-eastern border.

See also
Communes of the Tarn-et-Garonne department

References

Communes of Tarn-et-Garonne